Robert Strauss (November 8, 1913 – February 20, 1975) was an American actor. He became most familiar in Hollywood films of the 1950s such as Stalag 17 (1953), for which he was nominated for an Academy Award in the category of Best Supporting Actor.

Career
Strauss began his career as a classical actor, appearing in Twelfth Night and Macbeth on Broadway in 1930. Comedy became his specialty, and he was known best as Stalag 17's Stanislas "Animal" Kuzawa, a role he created in the original 1951 Broadway production and reprised in the 1953 film adaptation, for which he was nominated for an Academy Award for Best Supporting Actor.

His memorable comic characters included a maniac called "Jack the Slasher" in the 1953 Bob Hope comedy film Here Come the Girls and Daisy Mae's cretinous cousin Romeo Scragg in the 1959 musical comedy Li'l Abner, based on the Broadway show. He also was featured in the 1955 Marilyn Monroe comedy film The Seven Year Itch.

In more serious parts, Strauss appeared in the 1956 war film Attack! with Jack Palance, Eddie Albert and Lee Marvin.  He also had an important supporting role in the 1955 drama The Man with the Golden Arm.

Additional Broadway credits include Detective Story, Twentieth Century, and Portofino. Following his appearance in the latter, a short-lived 1958 disaster, Strauss went on to character roles in The Bridges at Toko-Ri and Wake Me When It's Over as well as a number of low-budget films for producers like Albert Zugsmith.

Strauss became familiar to television viewers through his appearances in The Beverly Hillbillies, Bonanza, The Monkees, and a recurring role on Bewitched as conniving private investigator Charlie Leach, who was one of the few mortals who knew Samantha was a witch. He also appeared on The Alfred Hitchcock Hour,  The Phil Silvers Show, Straightaway, Green Acres, The Dick van Dyke Show, and Rango. He played a goldfish-poking bad guy who was a murder victim in the 1959 Perry Mason episode, "The Case of the Dangerous Dowager."

In 1960, he played outlaw and casino owner "Howard C. Smith" in S3E11 of Gene Barry's TV Western Bat Masterson, intent on killing all witnesses to his guilty son's murder trail, Bat being the last.

He played Pete Kamboly in a 1965 episode "The Case of the Thermal Thief." His final film consisted of a solo performance in the experimental feature The Noah.

Strauss was a familiar voice in not a few radio dramas from the 1930s to the 1950s. His recurring roles included "Pa Wiggs" in the soap opera Mrs. Wiggs of the Cabbage Patch (1936–1938) and "Lively," a miner, in the 15-minute serial Our Gal Sunday that was broadcast on CBS from 1937 to 1959.

Personal life

Strauss was Jewish. He was first married to Audrey Bratty from 1951 to 1960. They had three children, Deena, Deja and David. After their divorce in 1960, he married Virginia Deeb the following year and remained with her until his death.

Death
Strauss was incapacitated during the final years of his life from the effects of multiple bouts of electroshock therapy applied to combat depression. He then suffered a paralyzing stroke. He died from an additional stroke on February 20, 1975. Strauss died at the New York University Hospital.

Partial filmography

 The Sleeping City (1950) - Police Lt. Barney Miller (uncredited)
 Sailor Beware (1952) - CPO Lardoski
 Jumping Jacks (1952) - Sgt. McClusky
 The Redhead from Wyoming (1953) - 'Knuckles' Hogan
 Stalag 17 (1953) - Sgt. Stanislas 'Animal' Kuzawa
 Here Come the Girls (1953) - Jack the Slasher
 Act of Love (1953) - Sgt. Johnny Blackwood
 Money from Home (1953) - Seldom Seen Kid
 The Atomic Kid (1954) - Stan Cooper
 The Bridges at Toko-Ri (1954) - Beer Barrel
 The Seven Year Itch (1955) - Mr. Kruhulik
 The Man with the Golden Arm (1955) - Schwiefka
 Attack! (1956) - Pfc. Bernstein
 Frontier Gun (1958) - Yubo
 I Mobster (1959) - Black Frankie Udino
 Inside the Mafia (1959) - Sam Galey
 4D Man (1959) - Roy Parker
 Li'l Abner! (1959) - Romeo Scragg
 Wake Me When It's Over (1960) - Sgt. Sam Weiscoff
 September Storm (1960) - Ernie Williams
 Dondi (1961) - Sammy Boy
 The Last Time I Saw Archie (1961) - MSgt. Stanley Erlenheim
 Twenty Plus Two (1961) - Jimmy Honsinger
 The George Raft Story (1961) - Frenchie
 Girls! Girls! Girls! (1962) - Sam (owner, Pirate's Den)
 The Thrill of It All (1963) - Chief Truck Driver
 The Wheeler Dealers (1963) - Feinberg, Taxi Driver
 Stage to Thunder Rock (1964) - Bob Acres
 Harlow (1965) - Hank
 The Family Jewels (1965) - Pool Hall Owner
 That Funny Feeling (1965) - Bartender
 Frankie and Johnny (1966) - Blackie
 Movie Star, American Style or; LSD, I Hate You (1966) - Joe Horner, Producer
 Fort Utah (1967) - Ben Stokes
 Dagmar's Hot Pants, Inc. (1971) - John Blackstone
 The Noah (Filmed 1968, Released 1975) - Noah (final film role)

References

External links

 
 
 

1913 births
1975 deaths
American male stage actors
American male film actors
American male television actors
Jewish American male actors
20th-century American male actors
Male actors from New York City
20th-century American Jews